Rincón de Luz is a 2003 Argentinian children's telenovela aired during 2003 on Canal 9 and later on América TV. It is a spin-off of the children's telenovela Chiquititas. It was starred by Soledad Pastorutti and Guido Kaczka, with the antagonistic participations of Melina Petriella, Alejandra Darín and Juan Ponce de León, Esteban Pérez and with the stellar performance of Salo Pasik and the first actress Susana Lanteri.

Story  
It all starts at Christmas, when Álvaro del Solar returns from Europe to receive his share of the family inheritance that his grandmother, Victoria del Solar, decided to share in life among all his grandchildren. It turns out that Mrs. Victoria does not want to give her part to Álvaro since she is trying to laziness and sees him as a good for nothing. On his way, Álvaro meets some kids named Tali, Julián, Carola, Lucas, Malena and Mateo and has the idea of creating an orphanage to be able to collect the inheritance as soon as possible with the help of his friends, Tobías, Javier and Delfina, who brings little Josefina to live with them. Soon the beautiful and sweet Soledad appears, who loves children very much unlike the bad director María Julia del Solar, and disguises herself as Mencha the guardian to approach the Solar family and get information about what happened with her ex-boyfriend Santiago, who suffers in a hospital bed due to an accident in the factory of this family and brings with him baby Ezequiel who joins the boys of the home and then discovers Laura, a "ghost girl". Then other boys come to the home like Josefina, Amir, Guillermo, Pía, Lucía, Úrsula and Estrella to live many adventures, secrets, pains, mysteries and loves, they begin, while Soledad begins to feel something for Álvaro and he also for her.

Cast 
 Soledad Pastorutti as Soledad Acosta
 Guido Kaczka as Álvaro del Solar 
 Melina Petriella as Delfina Díaz Guillén
 Nadia Di Cello as Nadia Fernández
 Agustín Sierra as Lucas Lagos
 Natalia Melcon as Natalia “Tali” Toledo
 Mariana Espósito as Malena Cabrera
 Stéfano de Gregorio as Mateo Salinas
 Milagros Flores as Bárbara Caride
 María Eugenia Suárez as Pía
 Candela Vetrano as Estrella
 Gastón Soffritti as Guillermo
 Florencia Padilla as Carola Villafañe
 Luciano Nóbile as Julián Ferraro
 Delfina Varni as Josefina Marini
 Ezequiel Díaz as Amir Shahsar
 Camila Salazar as Lucía Lagos
 José Zito as Sebastián Caride 
 Mía Flores Piran as Luciana Caride 
 Susana Lanteri as Victoria del Solar 
 Alejandra Darín as María Julia “Majula” del Solar 
 Adriana Salonia as Diana del Solar
 Salo Pasik as León Casares
 Sergio Surraco as Javier Jara
 Lucas Crespi as Tobías Franco
 Karina Dali as Floppy de la Canal
 Matthew Wutheron as Matias Rost
 Nicolás Goldschmidt as Rana
 Aleck Montanía as Ezequiel
 Laura Anders as Laura
 Camila Offerman as Úrsula
 Lucas Feriol as Ramiro
 Daiana de la Canal as Vicky
 Georgina Mollo as Clara
 Dolores Ocampo as Mercedes
 Juan Ponce de León as Juan Ignacio

Trivia 
 Felipe Colombo appeared in one episode of Rincón de Luz, and he portrayed himself.
 Most actors used to portray in popular kids' telenovela Chiquititas (1995-2001,2006).
 Natalia Melcon's role has the same name as in Chiquititas.
 In this show, Mariana Esposito made her debut.

External links 
 
 See Rincón de Luz at Official Website of Cris Morena Group.
 https://www.youtube.com/watch?v=ozO1UWvrOWU (introduction of Rincón de Luz)

2003 telenovelas
Argentine telenovelas
Children's telenovelas
2003 Argentine television series debuts
2003 Argentine television series endings
Spanish-language telenovelas
El Nueve original programming